Dave Barry Turns 40 is a humor book written by humor Columnist Dave Barry, about turning 40, as well as giving satirical advice on aging.

1990 non-fiction books
Comedy books
Works by Dave Barry